Bathygadus garretti is a species of rattail. This is a deep-water fish found in the waters around southern Japan and northern Taiwan.

This fish grows to a length of around 50 cm. It has a fairly wide, firm-boned head, terminal mouth with very small, conical teeth and large eyes. The scales are small, thin and deciduous.

The fish is named in honor of  Lieut. Commander LeRoy Mason Garrett (1857-1906) of the U.S. Navy. He was the commander of the fisheries steamer Albatross, from which the type specimen was collected, because of his contributions to the success of a 1906 expedition to the Northwest Pacific. Garrett was lost overboard during a storm on the return voyage from Japan.

References

A new species, Caelorinchus sheni, and 19 new records of grenadiers (Pisces: Gadiformes: Macrouridae) from Taiwan - CHIOU Mei-Luen ; SHAO Kwang-Tsao ; IWAMOTO Tomio

Macrouridae
Taxa named by Charles Henry Gilbert
Taxa named by Carl Leavitt Hubbs
Fish described in 1916